Sigma Pi is a collegiate fraternity with 233 chapters at American universities. As of 2021, the fraternity had more than 5,000 undergraduate members and over 110,000 alumni.

Sigma Pi headquarters are in Nashville, Tennessee.

The fraternity was founded on February 26, 1897, by William R Kennedy, James T Kingsbury, George M Patterson, and Rolin R James at Vincennes University. The group was initially known by the Greek letters Tau Phi Delta (ΤΦΔ), but was renamed Sigma Pi in 1907. The change of name was instigated by Robert George Patterson, then a student at Ohio State University. Patterson had wanted to join the Sigma Pi literary society at Illinois College in Jacksonville, Illinois, but the latter group had rejected his request to expand to OSU. In 1907 Patterson approached Tau Phi Delta members, claiming to represent a historic fraternity called Sigma Pi that dated to the 18th century. Tau Phi Delta accepted Patterson's invitation to merge and adopted the named Sigma Pi.

Later, Patterson's “history” of Sigma Pi was shown to be false, but the organization kept the name.

The organization oversees several charitable programs, including the Altruistic Campus Experience and maintains the Sigma Pi Educational Foundation "to assist needy and deserving students to complete their education; and to aid aged or disabled former students who are in need or worthy of assistance."

History

Founders

 Rolin Rosco James (October 16, 1879 – February 4, 1953): Born in Lincolnville, Indiana. Graduated from Vincennes University in 1900; A. B., Earlham College, 1902; Studied at Harvard Law School. He was a member of the Presbyterian Church and by profession, a consulting attorney.
 William Raper Kennedy (November 22, 1877 – December 5, 1944): Born in Vincennes, Indiana. Graduated Vincennes University in 1897. Served in the Spanish–American War and re-enlisted in the infantry a month after being discharged. He was continuously in military service and rose to the rank of lieutenant colonel in the infantry. He was a faculty member at Culver Military Academy from 1905 until retiring in 1944.
 James Thompson Kingsbury (January 8, 1877 – October 1, 1950): Born in Lawrence County, Illinois. Descended from the Kingsbury family who settled in Massachusetts in 1615. Graduated Vincennes University in 1897; A. B. University of Illinois 1899, LL.B 1902. Practiced law in Bisbee, Arizona. He was a member of the Christian Church and of Masonic Lodges in Tombstone, Arizona and Phoenix.
 George Martin Patterson (November 7, 1877 – April 7, 1960): Born in Palmyra, Township, Knox County, Indiana. His ancestors settled in Vincennes before Indiana became a state and was a prominent part in the development of that part of the country. Served as the Deputy Recorder of Knox County and then followed in his father's footsteps of farming.

Founding and early history (1897–1908)
On January 26, 1897, Charlotte N. Mallote, a professor of Latin and French, spoke to a group of students during chapel hour at Vincennes University about College Fraternities. One month later, on February 26, 1897, a new literary society had its first meeting, founded by James, Kennedy, Patterson, and Kingsbury. The first two initiates of the society were Samuel and Maurice Bayard, who were brought into the organization well before a name or constitution was established. The constitution, name, and first ritual were developed at the home of the Bayard's. The founders soon agreed upon a name, and the society was christened Tau Phi Delta (ΤΦΔ). By the end of its first year in 1898, Tau Phi Delta had 10 members, but the new Fraternity encountered membership struggles at the turn of the 20th century, as many of America's young men left to fight in the Spanish–American War. As such, personal endeavors were paused, while the nation focused all efforts and resources on the war that was raging in the Caribbean and Pacific Oceans. Key members of Tau Phi Delta, William Raper Kennedy, Lee B. Purcell, and Maurice Bayard had all left to fight in the war, leaving James as the sole member by the end of the war. James restored the society by initiating five new members shortly after the turn of the 20th century. These new members pressured James to change the name to Theta Gamma Psi (ΘΓΨ), but James successfully argued to keep the society named Tau Phi Delta. In 1903–1904, the Fraternity had grown so large that it stopped meeting at Vincennes, instead, meeting at The Bayard Cottage. This structure is considered the fraternity's first chapter house. In 1907, Tau Phi Delta began meeting at the old colonial residence of Judge J.P.L Weems. It was in the Niblack-Weems household that Tau Phi Delta was rechristened as Sigma Pi. The home would later play host to the first national congress.

In 1904–05, Tau Phi Delta finally began to seek expansion to other universities. Although rejected, a local fraternity at Indiana University petitioned to become the second chapter, and Tau Phi Delta began to engage in talks with other local fraternities at nearby universities. These discussions ultimately ended without expansion. Additional chapters would eventually be added after Tau Phi Delta became Sigma Pi on February 11, 1907.

In May 1908 the fraternity had its first National Convocation in Vincennes and charters were granted to groups at the University of Illinois (Phi chapter) and Ohio State University (Gamma chapter).  Francis L. Lisman was elected as the fraternity's first Grand Sage.

Patterson episode: how Sigma Pi got its name
Robert George Patterson (of no relation to the founder) was only 11 years old in 1896 when he first heard William Jennings Bryan speak. Patterson was convinced Jennings Bryan was the greatest American of his time. Shortly after the presidential election of 1896, Patterson read Jennings Bryan's autobiography The First Battle, which revealed Jennings Bryan was a member of Sigma Pi, a literary society at Illinois College in Jacksonville, Illinois. Patterson was determined to attend the college and follow the footsteps of Jennings Bryan. However, Patterson's parents forced him to attend the nearby Ohio State University, prohibiting him from joining the literary society that only existed at Illinois College.  Patterson still desired to become a member of the prestigious Sigma Pi. He wrote Sigma Pi at the Illinois College to petition for expansion but was rejected as the society refused to expand. Patterson also contacted another fraternity named Sigma Pi at the University of Toronto to request expansion but was again rejected.

In 1907, Patterson learned of Tau Phi Delta and wrote them asking if they would "consolidate with us and become a chapter of Sigma Pi Fraternity." Despite seeking to expand, Sigma Pi did not actually exist; Patterson was its sole member. Tau Phi Delta agreed and planned to consolidate. Patterson himself faked and made up the entire history of his Sigma Pi. Patterson stated it was founded in 1752 at the College of William & Mary and historical elites such as James Madison, Thomas Jefferson, Robert E. Lee, Jefferson Davis, and others were members. He claimed Sigma Pi failed during the Revolutionary War, but was kept alive by passing down its traditions from father to son. According to Patterson, Sigma Pi was revived in 1801 by Payne Todd, step-son of alleged member James Madison. He claimed Sigma Pi was successful until its repression by the Anti-Masonic Party in 1835. Patterson was the first to bring about its public revival since the repression. Under this guise, Sigma Pi expanded and added several chapters.

In 1909, Patterson's lies and fallacies began to collapse. The World Almanac published Patterson's Sigma Pi on its list of fraternities. It listed its founding date as 1752 and William Jennings Bryan as its most famous alumnus. Upon hearing this, Jennings Bryan sent letters to inform the magazine of its mistake and denounce his inclusion as its alumni. Jennings Bryan was a brother of the Delta Chi. He never belonged to any organization at the College of William & Mary, just Delta Chi Fraternity and Sigma Pi Literary Society at Illinois College. Furthermore, when Patterson submitted materials for Sigma Pi Fraternity's inclusion in William Raimond Baird's 7th edition of Baird's Manual of American College Fraternities, it was rejected. Discussing the request for inclusion, Baird wrote "all statements concerning the alleged origin of this society are inherently incredible." He suggested the story seemed to "be the product of a rather sophomoric imagination." Sigma Pi Fraternity, still unaware of Patterson's lies, appealed to Baird to reconsider. Baird refused and eventually published an article ridiculing Sigma Pi Fraternity to the entire Greek community. Patterson was immediately expelled from the society and all records bearing his name were deleted. Only in the second half of the 20th century did Sigma Pi research and include this incident in its history.

With the expulsion of Patterson at end of 1909, Sigma Pi had 5 chapters: Vincennes University, University of Illinois, Ohio State University, Temple University, and the University of Pennsylvania. At this time the Fraternity redesigned its badge, coat of arms, and ritual, becoming Sigma Pi as it is known today.

Early Growth: 1910–World War II
Sigma Pi survived the embarrassment of the Patterson Incident and continued to grow.  In 1910, the fraternity co-founded and became part of the National Interfraternity Conference, now known as the North American Interfraternity Conference. On July 15, 1911, Sigma Pi's official publication, The Emerald, was first published, although it would not be regularly published until 1914.  In 1913, Iota, the first chapter west of the Mississippi River was installed at the University of California, Berkeley. World War I saw only the Kappa chapter at Temple University close, although many others operated on a "skeleton" basis.  The fraternity was able to expand when men returned home at the end of the war and began, or resumed, their education.  By 1918 there were 14 chapters in seven states from California to New York.

In 1920 the fraternity produced its first song book, The Songs of Sigma Pi.  The book was produced by brothers James P. deWolfe, Herman S. Sidener, and Philip W. Timberlake.  That same year the fraternity opened its first chapter in the American south with the Omicron chapter at Tulane University.

Plans were first made for the creation of the Sigma Pi Foundation in 1922.  The fund sold life memberships to alumni and was an endowment fund for the fraternity.  Money raised was used to help chapters purchase housing and to fund other fraternity needs.  Life memberships also came with a lifetime subscription to The Emerald.  The fund was formally chartered in the State of Indiana on February 26, 1923.
 
From 1920 to 1927, Sigma Pi doubled in number of chapters and established a national office on May 16, 1927.  The first office was located in Roselle, NJ in the home of fraternity's first executive director, Harold Jacobsen. This small room was quickly overwhelmed and a 200 square foot office at 122 Chestnut Street was rented.  On February 23, 1929, proper office space was rented in rooms 322 and 323 of the Martin Building on Jefferson Avenue in Elizabeth, NJ which became the new national office.

In 1931 the fraternity produced its first pledge manual with brothers Oscar E. Gerney, Benjamin V. Ogden, and Harold Jacobsen being on the committee that produced it.  That same year, the fraternity saw the first publication of the Keryx newsletter.

In 1937, Mississippi State University chapter was installed, becoming the first new chapter formed from a colony. Before the Alpha-Lambda chapter, all new chapters had been fraternities or societies already in existence that agreed to consolidate into Sigma Pi.  That same year the fraternity hired brother James Hauser as its first field representative.

By May 1940, Sigma Pi had 34 active chapters and 2 inactive chapters, and had begun using the new I Believe pledge manual. World War II decimated the fraternity, causing it to almost disappear entirely. As all able bodied young men left to fight for their country or to serve in defense plants, few college aged men remained. By the end of the war, Sigma Pi had only 11 active chapters.

Post War era:  1945-1980

Following World War II, many veterans attended college under the GI Bill. Sigma Pi, again, took advantage of the spur in college enrollments. By 1950, Sigma Pi had grown up to 53 chapters, 7 of which remained inactive. In 1960, the Fraternity had grown another 10 chapters, leaving Sigma PI with 63 chapters.

In 1945, Byron R. Lewis made a contribution to the fraternity to start an educational fund to provide scholarships to worthy brothers.  This gift was the start of the Byron R. Lewis Educational Foundation which was incorporated in 1952.

The chartering of Beta-Kappa chapter at Arizona State University in 1951 was a special one for Sigma Pi.  Beta-Kappa is the only chapter (other than Alpha) to have a founder, James Thompson Kingsbury, assist with its founding.  Kingsbury assisted with the start of the Sigma Pi colony but died before the chapter received its charter.

During the 1960s the fraternity added 39 chapters, giving it 109 total chapters.  In 1961, Vincennes University (through the work of Curtis Shake and Isaac K. Beckes) donated the Shadowwood estate to the fraternity for use as its national headquarters.  After renovations in 1962 to Shadowwood's plumbing, heating, and electricity the fraternity moved its national office into the home on July 1, 1963.

1964 saw the merging of a national fraternity into Sigma Pi. A 1953 edict by the New York State Board of Regents prohibited any national fraternity from existing at any state-funded university.  Therefore, this forced many chapters of Delta Kappa fraternity to close or become local fraternities. The fraternity had been founded in New York state and half of its chapters were impacted by this.  Delta Kappa's national structure was weakened after the edict, but chapters in the rest of the country were determined to continue their national tradition. After ten years of trying to recover, Delta Kappa's national leadership began looking for another fraternity for its chapters to join.  They petitioned Sigma Pi for membership for their six remaining chapters.  This was approved in 1964, and consequently, four Delta Kappa chapters were re-initiated as members of Sigma Pi.

William J. Cutbirth became the first Sigma Pi to be president of the North American Interfraternity Conference when he was elected to a term running from 1974 to 1976.

International era, 1980-Present
The 1980s saw growth in the fraternity as it chartered 42 new chapters during the decade.

In 1984 Sigma Pi became an international organization upon the chartering of the first Canadian chapter (Zeta-Iota at Western Ontario), ushering the fraternity to change its name to the current title, Sigma Pi Fraternity International.

In 1988, the fraternity was bequeathed the Rose Hill Farmstead by the family of founder George Martin Patterson.  The property was visible from the Shadowwood headquarters.  The fraternity sold the property to the Sigma Pi Educational Foundation in 1992.

In 2003, the fraternity moved its international offices to Brentwood, TN as it was not as isolated as Vincennes.  Being closer to a major city allowed for better access to airports and computer network infrastructure.  The fraternity rented offices in the Gallatin Building until a property could be purchased.  The fraternity sold the Shadowwood Estate in 2005 to a private individual.  An office was found on Wilson Pike Circle and the fraternity's offices moved there in 2007.  In 2013, the fraternity sold the property on Wilson Pike Circle and purchased the Mitchell House in Lebanon, Tennessee from Cracker Barrel Old Country Store for use as its headquarters.  It held the grand opening of the building on March 29, 2014. After more than five years at the Mitchell House, the Executive Office moved to a new location near downtown Nashville and the Nashville International Airport.

Alpha chapter at Vincennes University: preserving Sigma Pi's history

After its founding in 1897, the Alpha chapter at Vincennes University closed in 1910. It remained dormant for 55 years until 1965 when the Alpha chapter was re-activated. Grand Sage Frank C. Fryburg worked with the students and administration at Vincennes to re-activate the chapter. However, the North American Interfraternity Conference prevented its members from opening chapters at 2 year Junior colleges. Honorary Grand Sage Curtis G. Shake was tasked with creating a formal petition to the NIC, which requested special dispensation be granted to Sigma Pi to reopen the chapter. The petition passed and on February 26, 1965, Alpha chapter was re-charted. In December 1970, the success of the Alpha chapter convinced the NIC to allow chapters at all junior colleges.  A clock tower on the campus of Vincennes University commemorates the foundation of Sigma Pi.  Despite Sigma Pi's diminished presence in the area after the move of its headquarters, the fraternity still recognizes and celebrates the university as its birthplace. The Alpha chapter is still active today, claiming some of the university's most notable alumni, including three Vincennes University Presidents, as members.

Government
Sigma Pi has three main subordinate bodies: chapters, Alumni Clubs, and colonies. A colony is started by a group of men at a university, who are interested in joining Sigma Pi. No man in a colony is initiated, until the chapter is chartered. An active chapter is composed of at least twenty-five active members and is also in good standing with their respective college or university and with the Grand chapter. To be in good standing with the Grand chapter, a chapter must pay all financial debts, be in good judicial standing, and host all required events. Alumni Clubs are composed of Sigma Pi members, who are no longer undergraduates, but retain their affiliation with Sigma Pi. Alumni Clubs are created by geography or for a particular chapter. All three are important in the continued success of Sigma Pi.

Sigma Pi is governed by its Constitution and Bylaws, as well as the rules and regulations of the North-American Interfraternal Conference. Individual chapters are also subjected to the regulations of the administration of their school and the local Interfraternal Council. Sigma Pi Fraternity has resolved to hold its chapters accountable for compliance with all Grand chapter and University policies, FIPG guidelines, new member education policies, minimum standards on chapter membership, and adherence to the governing laws of the Fraternity.

Any man, who meets the requirements, may be offered a bid to membership. Honorary membership may be extended to relatives of members, alumni and members of the faculty or administration of a university. Once accepting membership, all men are governed by the Bylaws and Constitution of Sigma Pi. The Constitution and Bylaws of Sigma Pi are reviewed and may be changed by a favorable vote at a Convocation held biennially. Sigma Pi is ruled by a Grand chapter, which reflects the structure that governs individual chapters. Individual chapters and the Grand chapter are ruled by Robert's Rules of Order.

Grand Chapter
The Grand Chapter consists of chapter and alumni club delegates, past, present, and honorary Grand Officers, and Founders' Award recipients. The Grand Chapter is headed by the Grand Council. Each alumni club is given one vote. Each chapter in good standing is given 2 votes. A colony receives no votes until is it charted and becomes a chapter. Robert's Rules of Order dictate meetings of the Grand chapter. The Grand Chapter has full jurisdiction over the Fraternity, elects officers, amends the Constitution and Bylaws and possesses all powers of a legislative assembly. Meetings of the Grand chapter are held every two years at a Convocation. Each chapter is required to send one delegate.

When the Grand Chapter is not in session, all governmental power is vested in the Grand Council. The Grand Council consists of 7 officers, who are elected at the Biennial Convocation for a term of two years. Before 2010, the Grand Council previously was concerned with policy creation and the implementation. In 2010, Sigma Pi changed its governance policy, as it decided the Grand Council was too pre-occupied with implementation to be truly effective. The Grand Council has become essentially a Board of Governors. They design end policies based upon dialogue with members. The Executive Office Staff at the Lebanon, Tennessee Headquarters then determines the means by which the policies will be achieved and implemented. Any member of Sigma Pi may be elected to any of the seven positions on the Grand Chapter. Generally candidates have served on the Grand Chapter previously. The Bylaws of Sigma Pi allow the Grand Chapter to maintain two standing committees: scholarship and expansion.

Grand Council structure
The titles and roles of the government of Sigma Pi at the Grand and chapter level are summarized below:
 Grand Sage (President) – Presides over the fraternity, as well as acting as chairman and chief governance officer. He leads the discussions of the chapter.
Grand Second Counselor (Vice President) – Assumes the role of Sage, when the Sage is absent or unable to perform his duties. He also is in charge of the committees to ensure they accomplish what has been assigned to them.
 Grand Third Counselor (Treasurer) – Controls the financials of the fraternity and makes sure all decisions are financially sound.
 Grand Fourth Counselor (Secretary) – Controls the minutes of meetings, as well as all correspondence. He also keeps accurate records of membership.
 Grand First Counselor (Sergeant at Arms) – Acts as a parliamentarian, risk management, alumni secretary.
 Grand Herald (Historian) – Keeps historical records of Sigma Pi.
 Past Grand Sage – Provides continuity.

Differences between Grand Chapter and chapters
The government of individual chapters mirrors the Grand Chapter, except the use of the prefix "Grand." Since the Grand Council has essentially become a board of directors using policy governance, the traditional roles of each member of the Grand Council are no longer strictly followed. However, in the individual chapters this is not the case; a chapter's executive council follow the traditional duties of their position.  chapters are required to maintain scholarship, recruitment, pledge education, finance, social, and intramural committees. They are encouraged, but not required, to have: alumni relations, public relations, risk management, and community service. Each chapter is required to have an adviser, generally encouraged to be an alumnus or faculty member, but may be anyone. They are free to make any rules that do not conflict with the regulations of Sigma Pi International, National Laws, individual rules of the Interfraternal Council, and their college or university.

Executive Office and Executive Director
The Executive Office, located in Nashville, Tennessee, serves as an information and service center as well as being the primary record keeper of the fraternity. Information and assistance is available for all phases of chapter operations. All templates of forms and other materials are kept at the Executive Office. All of the Fraternity's publications are prepared and distributed at the Executive Offices.  A small museum also exists at the Executive Office which consists of items donated by famous members and artifacts from the Fraternity's history.

As noted the Grand Chapter and Grand Council simply dictate end policies. After dictating end policies, the implementation of those policies falls on the Executive Office. The Chief Executive Officer or executive director is responsible for the management of the headquarters, including all staff and operations of the Fraternity. He devotes his time to the interests of the Fraternity, reports directly to the Grand Sage, and is responsible to the orders of the Grand Council. He is required to maintain full and accurate records of the business affairs of Sigma Pi. He gives periodic reports to the Grand Council, Grand Chapter, and Convocations. The executive director previously traveled to chapters to advise them personally. But with the large size of the fraternity over the entire country, this became impractical and unhelpful.

Sigma Pi initially created the Educational Leadership Consultants (ELC) program to fill this role. An ELC was a young alumnus selected for the position based on his undergraduate education and experience. He underwent a training period to prepare him for his advising role then traveled to all chapters in his jurisdiction. He then helped them develop programs to improve their chapters. This program was replaced in 2013 with the Regional Director's Program.  This program consisted of older alumni who would assist chapters in specific geographical regions. Executive Director Jonathan Frost will implement a new Chapter Management Associate system, which will be put in place prior to the 2018–2019 academic year.

Foundations of membership

Sigma Pi, like many social fraternities, limits membership to men only. Requirements can vary by campus, depending on the rules of the university or college and the standards dictated by the campus Interfraternity Council. Generally Sigma Pi requires members to be in good academic standing and be active in the campus community. Potential members meet the brothers of a chapter during a process called rush. Following rush, the chapter convenes and votes on potential new members. With a favorable vote by the entire chapter, a potential new member will be offered a bid to join the local Sigma Pi chapter. If accepted, the man begins his pledgeship. Sigma Pi defines a pledge as "a man who has assented to become a member and who has been elected to membership, but has not yet been initiated." During this period the pledge and the Fraternity come to know each other better and mutually reaffirm the decision to become full members in Sigma Pi. During his pledgeship, a man will learn about the Fraternity's history, operations, and reasons for existence. He will also learn how his specific chapter operates and what is expected of him as a brother. A pledge has no right to exert influence on chapter policy or organization until he is granted full membership upon initiation; however, a pledge should still participate in conversations about chapter policy and organization with initiated members. Generally the pledge should speak through his big brother or the new member educator.

Sigma Pi Fraternity International has a strict no hazing policy. Briefly Sigma Pi defines hazing as anything that produces physical or mental stress. A pledge surrenders no legal or social rights, none of his personal or family ties, nor any of his moral or religious ideas or standards, when accepting an invitation to join Sigma Pi. Although not an initiated member, a pledge should not be viewed as less than or unequal to a member. He simply does not know the secrets and rituals of Sigma Pi. His status as a pledge in no way entitles members to treat him any differently than any other member of Sigma Pi.

Although a pledge may not know everything about Sigma Pi, he is still governed by the expectations and rules of Sigma Pi. Some of the important principles, ideals and obligations are expressed below.

Sigma Pi Motto

The mother of the first two initiates of Sigma Pi, Samuel and Maurice Bayard, chose the Fraternity's motto during one of the first meetings. There was much debate about the appropriate motto, and no agreement could be reached among the members. Attempting to point the fraternity in the right direction, Ms. Joseph L. Bayard (née Orr) took a volume of Robert Browning's poems from a shelf, turned to A Death in the Desert, reading what would become the motto.

Five ideals
Sigma Pi Fraternity promotes five basic ideals, which a brother considers to be of extreme worth. Each ideal is mentioned in the Creed of Sigma Pi. Each ideal represents goals which every member is encouraged to strive toward in their own daily life.

The First Ideal:     To establish a brotherhood.
The Second Ideal:    To establish and maintain an aristocracy of learning.
The Third Ideal:     To raise the standards of morality and develop character.
The Fourth Ideal:    To diffuse culture and encourage chivalry.
The Fifth Ideal:     To promote the spirit of civic righteousness and quicken the national conscience.

Creed
By committing to Sigma Pi, Brothers also strive to follow the five ideals as expressed in the Sigma Pi Creed. It is the guide and ideal around which a brother patterns his life.

Ten obligations of members
Sigma Pi demands its members have a reasonable amount of interest and participation in its affairs. Sigma Pi's expectations are summarized by the 10 obligations. All brothers are expected to regard each obligation with utmost seriousness and strive to work towards their fulfillment. If properly followed, these obligations help make Sigma Pi chapters run effectively and efficiently as well as making Sigma Pi men outstanding members of their communities and society.

The First Obligation: Give proper attention to the interests of Sigma Pi.
The Second Obligation: Regard the Fraternity with a spirit of sincerity and respect and give earnest considerations to its teachings and ideals.
The Third Obligation: Meet Financial Obligations Promptly And Fully.
The Fourth Obligation: Cheerfully perform tasks that may be assigned for the good of the Fraternity. 
The Fifth Obligation: At all times be a gentleman and use moderation in all things.
The Sixth Obligation: Strive at all times to cooperate for the good of the Fraternity.
The Seventh Obligation: Work diligently to maintain good scholarship.
The Eighth Obligation: Participate in worthy college activities.
The Ninth Obligation: Profit by associations with men in a spirit of fraternalism.
The Tenth Obligation: Be an exemplary Sigma Pi and citizen.

Expectations of membership
Sigma Pi has several expectations of members to help them gain the most from their membership in Sigma Pi. These expectations are expressed below.

 I will respect the dignity of all persons, and therefore, I will not physically, psychologically, or sexually abuse any human being.
 I will respect the rights of property, both others and my own; therefore I will not, nor will I tolerate, the abuse of private or community property.
 I will pay all of my financial obligations in a timely manner.
 I will not use nor support the use of illegal drugs.
 I will not abuse nor support the abuse of alcohol.
 I acknowledge that a clean and an attractive environment is essential to both physical and mental health; therefore, I will do all in my power to see that the chapter property is properly cleaned and maintained.
 I will confront the members of my Fraternity who are violating the bylaws and policies.

Philanthropy
Sigma Pi encourages a fraternal culture that promotes its ideals by philanthropic events for its members and the communities in which its chapters are located. Each chapter is required to complete regular philanthropy events and participate in Sigma Pi's Altruistic Campus Experience (ACE). The ACE project is in addition to each chapter's normal philanthropy events that it holds throughout the year. Finally, Sigma Pi's Educational Fund provides assistance to students to cover the costs of college tuition.

General philanthropy
Every two years at the Biennium Convention, Sigma Pi selects a new charity organization as the official philanthropy of Sigma Pi. At times Sigma Pi will select more than one charity. Usually Sigma Pi selects charities created by or for brothers and their families. In doing so Sigma Pi hopes to turn tragedies into rallying points to help promote and encourage a cause that has affected brothers as well as their families.

At this time, Sigma Pi focuses its philanthropic efforts on two organizations for the following two years; the Amazing Day Foundation, and Donate Life America. Furthermore, Sigma Pi requires each individual chapter to sponsor philanthropy events throughout the academic school year. Sigma Pi even encourages chapters to participate in Philanthropy events that occur during school breaks and summers. The Fraternity currently allows each individual chapter to assist any charitable causes as they see fit.

Educational fund
Beginning in 1947, Honorary Grand Sage Byron R. Lewis (Member of both the Alpha and Phi chapters) donated several monetary gifts, recommending that the money be used to begin an educational fund. In his name the Byron R. Lewis Educational Fund was established. Its stated goals were to: "supplement the work of colleges in the educational development of students; to assist needy and deserving students to complete their education; and to aid aged or disabled former students who are in need or worthy of assistance." And in 1992, the fund was renamed the Sigma Pi Educational Foundation. Any Sigma Pi member in good standing may become a member of the Educational Foundation by contributing an annual 100 dollar membership fee or $5,000 in lifetime gifts. As such, in 2000, the Foundation's assets were worth more than 2.3 million dollars. The Educational foundation's growth supports Sigma Pi members in their continuing quest for education. At the 2012 Convocation in San Antonio, Texas, Sigma Pi unanimously voted to collect 5 dollars per undergraduate member per year specifically designated for the educational foundation.

Altruistic Campus Experience
The "ACE" (Altruistic Campus Experience) Project began in the fall of 2002 when Former Executive Director Mark Briscoe re-evaluated the role of Greek life on campus.  The project is the first fraternity or sorority campus service program for chapters specifically designed to benefit their host institutions. The program is designed to improve the campuses, on which chapters are located, thereby improving the collegiate experience for the entire college or university. Every project is unique to the individual campuses of each chapter. chapters are asked to determine a campus need and work to fill that need. The university must be aware of and approve the project prior to beginning the project.

Publications

Sigma Pi has several publications, which aid its operations. Each serves a specific purpose within the Fraternity that helps Sigma Pi in all facets of membership. The fraternity has promotional literature to help promote Greek Life in general but also membership in Sigma Pi. Manuals are produced that aid the pledge education process, as well as all ritual information. Sigma Pi finally produces a magazine to keep alumni members informed.  These publications are all written, edited, and updated at Sigma Pi's Headquarters in Lebanon, Tennessee.

The Emerald of Sigma Pi
Commonly referred to as The Emerald, the magazine is published three time a year. It is sent to initiated members, libraries, Greek advisors, other Greek organizations, and any other subscribers. Louis L. Moore (Kappa, Temple University) edited the magazine's first issue, which was published July 15, 1911. Due to the lack of financial support, The Emerald was not published again for nearly 3 years. Luther C. Weeks (Eta, Purdue University) published three issues starting in October 1914. Weeks' Emerald created the standard for its publication that still exists today. The Emerald is designed to inform members of the progress and circumstances surrounding Sigma Pi on a national and chapter level. Many of the articles are produced by individual chapters and brothers. Each chapter's herald writes a brief article with pictures detailing its activities. Each chapter's essay is published. Alumni are also encourages to write brief articles about their life progress. The Emerald helps keep alumni connected to Sigma Pi, which asks for membership that lasts a lifetime.

The Keryx
The Keryx was created in July 1931 to be the esoteric publication of Sigma Pi. It has been printed in many different formats over the years. Its purpose is to bring news of important matters and activities relating to the Fraternity's welfare to every initiated member. It may include financial statements of the Grand Chapter, Convocation proceedings, and reports on Grand Council meetings.

The Manual of Ceremonies
The Manual of Ceremonies is the printed book, which contains the rituals of Sigma Pi. Each chapter is only allowed to have six copies of The Manual of Ceremonies. It is the chapter's duty to safeguard this publication and make sure only initiated members see it.

I Believe – The Sigma Pi Pledge Manual
First published in 1940, the I Believe is distributed to every man who pledges Sigma Pi and pays his pledge deposit. The I Believe contains information on the history of fraternities in general, general etiquette, the value of membership in Sigma Pi, Sigma Pi's ideals, history, and government among many other topics. It is the comprehensive and complete guide to everything a new member must know before becoming an initiated member in Sigma Pi.

Who's Who in Sigma Pi
Who's Who in Sigma Pi is a directory of every member of Sigma Pi. It is published at least once a decade, but all records are kept on computers for viewing at any time by Executive Office Staff or initiated member through the MySigmaPi online portal. It has both alphabetical and geographical information on members. Geographical information can be sorted by region or chapter.

Song book
The first publication, entitled Songs of Sigma Pi, was published in 1922. The song book was not reprinted until 1968, when Sigma Pi Sings was published. It was edited by William L. Lane and included all the songs that the Fraternity considered important with lyrics and sheet music.

Notable Sigma Pi brothers and alumni 

With more than 100 active chapters and colonies in the United States and Canada, Sigma Pi has over 110,000 alumni. Sigma Pi has alumni who are notable in many different industries and fields.

Local chapter or member misconduct 
In November 2014, the chapter at Elon University temporarily lost its charter after its national office, as well as Elon officials, were notified about several new members suffering injuries from being forced to lie down on bottle caps. The chapter was a repeat hazing offender.  The chapter was eligible to seek reinstatement on campus in fall 2017.

In December 2016, a former chapter of the fraternity made national headlines after disturbing photos leaked of former members hazing at the then-closed Hofstra University chapter.  A former pledge and expelled member of the fraternity leaked photos showing individuals who appear to be pledges locked in small cages and photos showing additional individuals who appear to be pledges shirtless, blindfolded, covered in hot sauce, and kneeling in front of a swastika. On March 1, 2016 - nine months prior to the release of these photos - the Grand Council of Sigma Pi revoked the chapter's charter due to "violations of both Fraternity and FIPG risk management policies."

In October 2016, Gamma-Sigma chapter at the University of Missouri opted to withdraw from the university's Greek community due to alleged overzealous enforcement of the student code of conduct against members of the chapter. Shortly after the chapter withdrew from the Greek community, the University of Missouri banned Sigma Pi from campus. This rift was caused when a pledge was sent to an emergency room with bruises on his buttocks and a blood alcohol level of 0.34.

In March 2017, the Executive Office of Sigma Pi opted to close its colony at Illinois Wesleyan University after an investigation launched due to a member of the colony being pulled over for drunk driving. The investigation found that the colony may have sponsored an event where underage drinking could have occurred. This was the colony's first offense, though a prior iteration of Sigma Pi on this campus faced its own risk management problems. The colony was noted in this case to have a "failure to attend to the culture of risk management."

In mid-November 2018, a pledge was found unresponsive and later pronounced dead at an unofficial annex house to Ohio University's Epsilon chapter of Sigma Pi. The chapter was issued a cease and desist by the school's administration and the incident is under investigation by Ohio University and Athens, Ohio police. In April 2019, Ohio University permanently barred Sigma Pi from operating at any of its campuses. Current Sigma Pi members are additionally barred from joining any other social fraternity on campus or creating or colonizing a new fraternity. In February 2019, the estate of the deceased pledge, Collin Wiant, filed a wrongful death lawsuit against Sigma Pi alleging that Wiant and other pledges were hazed. This hazing included being forced to drink a gallon of beer in one hour, and be beaten and humiliated. The suit alleges that this pattern of activity ultimately resulted in Wiant's death.

On April 12, 2019, a University at Buffalo chapter caused all Greek life at the university to be suspended along with the creation of a new internal review committee for Greek Life following potential hazing. The student, Sebastian Serafin-Bazan, died five days later. The investigation is ongoing as of April 17, 2019.

See also
List of social fraternities and sororities
List of Sigma Pi chapters
List of Sigma Pi brothers

References

External links

Sigma Pi's Notable Alumni

 
North American Interfraternity Conference
Student organizations established in 1897
Fraternity Leadership Association
Student societies in the United States
Fraternities and sororities in the United States
Fraternities and sororities in Canada
1897 establishments in Indiana